Atuona, located on Atuona Bay on the southern side of Hiva Oa island, French Polynesia, is the administrative centre of the commune (municipality) of Hiva-Oa. Atuona was the capital of all the Marquesas Islands but it has been replaced by Taiohae (on Nuku Hiva).

The peak Temetiu, rising to 1,213 m (3,980 ft) above sea level, towers above the town.

Atuona was the final home of Paul Gauguin, who died there in 1903 and is buried in Calvary Cemetery, which overlooks the town.  The Belgian singer Jacques Brel is also buried there.  In 2003, construction on the Paul Gauguin Cultural Center was completed in Atuona.

Climate

http://www.worldweatheronline.com/v2/weather-averages.aspx?q=HIX

See also
French Polynesia

References

External links

Gauguin Cultural Center

Populated places in the Marquesas Islands